Ben Malena (born May 29, 1992) is a Canadian football running back for the Toronto Argonauts of the Canadian Football League (CFL). He was signed as an undrafted free agent by the Dallas Cowboys after the 2014 NFL Draft. He played college football at Texas A&M.

Professional career

Dallas Cowboys 
On May 12, 2014, Malena signed with the Dallas Cowboys. On August 9, 2014, he was waived.

Houston Texans 
On August 29, 2014, Malena was signed to the Houston Texans' practice squad. On December 29, 2014, Malena signed a reserve/future contract with the Houston Texans. On May 8, 2015, he was waived.

Dallas Cowboys (second stint) 
On May 15, 2015, Malena signed with the Dallas Cowboys. On September 5, 2015, he was waived.

On December 2, 2015, Malena signed to the Dallas Cowboys' practice squad. On January 4, 2016, Malena signed a reserve/future contract with the Dallas Cowboys. On May 6, 2016, he was waived.

Toronto Argonauts
On September 14th, 2016, Malena signed with the Argonauts.

Personal life 
At Texas A&M University, Malena majored in recreation, parks, and tourism science.

References 

1992 births
Living people
American football running backs
American players of Canadian football
Canadian football running backs
Dallas Cowboys players
Houston Texans players
People from Cedar Hill, Texas
Players of American football from Texas
Sportspeople from the Dallas–Fort Worth metroplex
Texas A&M Aggies football players
Toronto Argonauts players